Shuja'iyya, also Shejaiya, Shijaiyeh, Shujayya, Shuja'ia, Shuja'iya, is a neighborhood district of the Palestinian city of Gaza and one of the largest neighborhoods in Gaza with 92,000 to 100,000 residents. It is located east of Gaza's city center, and its nucleus is situated on a hill located across the main Salah al-Din Road that runs north-south throughout the Gaza Strip. Shuja'iyya contains several ancient structures, mosques and tombs.

History
Shuja'iyya dates from the Ayyubid period in Gaza, and is named after Shuja' al-Din Uthman al-Kurdi, an Ayyubid emir ("commander") who died fighting against the Crusaders in 1239.  The district is the first extension of Gaza beyond its Old City,  and was a mixed quarter, as opposed to other quarters of Gaza. It was generally a commercial district, but also partially residential. During the Middle Ages, the neighborhood's houses were poorly built and its roads were narrow and unpaved. However, it also boasted many extravagant mosques and Muslim sanctuaries. The 14th-century Ibn Uthman Mosque and al-Zufurdimri Mosque are located in Shuja'iyya, The 15th-century Mahkamah Mosque is also located there.

Being built outside the city's wall, Shuja'iyya had more potential to grow than the al-Daraj, Zaytoun, and al-Tuffah quarters. It eventually grew to become the largest neighborhood in Gaza. It was divided into separate northern and southern parts along ethnic lines. The southern part of the area is called al-Turkuman because of the concentration of Turkoman clans who settled there during the reign of Ayyubid sultan as-Salih Ayyub between 1240-49. The northern part was called al-Judaida or Shuja'iyya al-Akrad. It was populated by Kurds originally from the Mosul area.

The Ottoman census of 1525 shows a relatively equal population of Turks and Kurds, with 89 and 90 households, respectively. The Jews were the single largest ethnic group with 95 households, while the Christians had 82. In 1538, however, the Kurdish and Turkoman populations grew dramatically, especially the former. The Kurds had 278 households while the Turks had 181. In 1549, the Kurdish population grew sharply to 406 houses, while the Turkomans maintained a steady growth to 195 houses. The remnants of Mamluk military units resided in their own separate small community in Shuja'iyya. Their population consisted of 44 households in 1557 which dwindled to 66 persons in 1597.

Modern era

The Shuja'iya Primary School for Girls was founded in the neighborhood in 1967. In 2011 it had an enrollment of 1,326 students. On October 6, 1987, just prior to the outbreak of the First Intifada, Shuja'iyya was the site of an armed confrontation between the Palestinian Islamic Jihad and the Israeli Army (IDF). The clash resulted in the death of an IDF officer and four Islamic Jihad militants, and the day has been commemorated by the latter as the "Battle of Shuja'iyya." On the first anniversary of the operation, in 1988, the Islamic Jihad called for a general strike against Israel.

The neighborhood is a long-term stronghold of Hamas. The rival Fatah-aligned Hilles clan carried influence in Shuja'iyya until Hamas police claimed that they were hiding suspects of a previous bombing in the city, consequently resulting in clashes between police forces and clan members, resulting in nine deaths and causing several men from the Hilles clan to leave the neighborhood for resettlement in the West Bank.

Shuja'iyya had been a frequent target in Israel's 2008-09 airstrikes of the Gaza Strip, which killed several members of Hamas' security forces and destroyed the local police station. A coalition of Hamas and Islamic Jihad forces battled intensely with the IDF days after the airstrikes. Hamas claimed to have lost three fighters, including a local commander after an Israeli airstrike and the Fatah-affiliated al-Aqsa Martyrs Brigades lost a fighter after ambushing undercover Israeli forces in the district. A women and children's clinic was destroyed by an Israeli airstrike during the hostilities with no casualties reported.

During the 2014 Gaza war, Shuja'iyya was the location of the Battle of Shuja'iyya, the fiercest battle of the war, and was heavily shelled by Israeli forces. Between 65 and 120 Palestinians were killed in the fighting, including at least 17 children, 14 women and four elderly persons, as well as 13 Israeli soldiers. Israel stated the district was targeted because 8% of the rocket attacks by Palestinian forces against Israel originated in Shuja'iyya because the area was allegedly a source of tunnels crossing into Israel. After the 2014 war, an Israeli brigade gave soldiers who fought in Shuja'iyya before and after photos, showing the damage.  IDF sources said the incident was under investigation. Reconstruction of the quarter is complicated by UN priorities. Funding is allocated according to a ladder of importance, from small to large-scale damage, and many of the cement vouchers for families are sold on the black market.

Economy
Gaza's largest market, specializing mostly in clothes and household goods, is in Shuja'iyya; Midan Shuja'iyya ("Shuja'iyya Square") is located at the entrance of the neighborhood from the Old City. Omar Mukhtar Street starts in the district and ends in Rimal. The Municipality of Gaza is implementing a project to enhance Shuja'iyya. It aims to improve the environment and living conditions of its citizens, by widening, restoring, and repairing roads in the district. There is also a development of land located along Salah ad-Din Street, known as Park al-Bastat Shuja'iyya.

Notable people
Baha Abu al-Ata
Khalil al-Hayya
Rushdi al-Shawa
Ramadan Shalah
Ahmed Jabari
 Umm Nidal
 Ziad Abu-Amr

References

Bibliography

External links
Survey of Western Palestine, Map 19:   IAA, Wikimedia commons 

13th-century establishments in Asia
Neighborhoods of Gaza City